William Clark Gable (February 1, 1901November 16, 1960) was an American film actor. Often referred to as The King of Hollywood, He had roles in more than 60 motion pictures in multiple genres during a career that lasted 37 years, three decades of which was as a leading man. Gable died of a heart attack at the age of 59; his final on-screen appearance was as an aging cowboy in The Misfits, released posthumously in 1961.

Gable was one of the most consistent box-office performers in the history of Hollywood, appearing on Quigley Publishing's annual Top Ten Money Making Stars Poll sixteen times. He was named the seventh greatest male movie star of classic American cinema by the American Film Institute. He appeared opposite many of the most popular actresses of their time. Joan Crawford was a favorite actress of his to work with, and he partnered with her in eight films. Myrna Loy worked with him seven times, and he was paired with Jean Harlow in six productions. He also starred with Lana Turner in four features, and in three each with Norma Shearer and Ava Gardner.

Life and career

1901–1919: Early life 

William Clark Gable was born on February 1, 1901, in Cadiz, Ohio, to William Henry "Will" Gable (1870–1948), an oil-well driller, and his wife Adeline ( Hershelman). His father was a Protestant and his mother a Catholic. Gable was named Bill after his father, but he was almost always called Clark, and referred to as "the kid" by his father.
Gable was six months old when he was baptized at a Roman Catholic church in Dennison, Ohio. When he was ten months old, his mother died. His father refused to raise him in the Catholic faith, which provoked criticism from the Hershelman family. The dispute was resolved when his father agreed to allow him to spend time with his maternal uncle Charles Hershelman and his wife on their farm in Vernon Township, Pennsylvania. In April 1903, Gable's father married Jennie Dunlap (1874–1920).

Gable's stepmother raised the tall, shy child with a loud voice to be well-dressed and well-groomed. She played the piano and gave him lessons at home. He later took up brass instruments, becoming the only boy in the Hopedale Men's town band at age 13. Gable was mechanically inclined and loved to repair cars with his father, who insisted that he engage in masculine activities such as hunting and hard physical work. Gable also loved literature; he would recite Shakespeare among trusted company, particularly the sonnets.

His father had financial difficulties in 1917 and decided to try his hand at farming, and moved the family to Palmyra Township, near Akron, Ohio. His father insisted that he work the farm, but Gable soon left to work in Akron for the Firestone Tire and Rubber Company.

1920–1923: Early career 
Gable was inspired to become an actor after seeing the play The Bird of Paradise at age 17, but he was unable to make a start in acting until he turned 21 and received his $300 inheritance from a Hershelman trust. After his stepmother died in 1920, his father moved to Tulsa, Oklahoma, going back into the oil business. He worked with his father for some time wildcatting and sludge removing in the oil fields of Oklahoma before traveling to the Pacific Northwest.

Gable toured in second-class stock companies, finding work with traveling tent shows, lumber mills, and other odd jobs. He made his way across the Midwest to Portland, Oregon, where he worked as a necktie salesman in the Meier & Frank department store. Also working there was local stage actor Earle Larimore, (the nephew of Laura Hope Crews who portrayed Aunt Pittypat alongside Gable in Gone with the Wind) who encouraged Gable to return to acting. Though Larimore didn't invite him to join his theater group The Red Lantern Players, he did introduce Gable to one of its members, Franz Dorfler, and they started dating. After the couple's audition for The Astoria Players, Gable's lack of training was evident, but the theater group accepted him after cajoling from Larimore. Gable and Dorfler moved to Astoria, Oregon, touring with the group until its bankruptcy, and then moved back to Portland where Gable obtained a day job with Pacific Telephone and started receiving dramatic lessons in the evening.

Gable's acting coach, Josephine Dillon, was a theater manager in Portland. She paid to have his teeth fixed and his hair styled. She guided him in building up his chronically undernourished body, and taught him better body control and posture. He slowly managed to lower his naturally high-pitched voice, his speech habits improved, and his facial expressions became more natural and convincing. After a long period of her training, Dillon considered Gable ready to attempt a film career.

1924–1930: Stage and silent films 

Gable and Dillon traveled to Hollywood in 1924. Dillon became his manager and also his wife; she was 17 years his senior. He changed his stage name from W. C. Gable to Clark Gable and appeared as an extra in such silent films as Erich von Stroheim's The Merry Widow (1925), The Plastic Age (1925) starring Clara Bow, and Forbidden Paradise (1924) starring Pola Negri. He appeared in a series of two-reel comedies called The Pacemakers and in Fox's The Johnstown Flood (1926). He also appeared as a bit player in a series of shorts. However, he was not offered any major film roles, so he returned to the stage in What Price Glory? (1925).

He became lifelong friends with Lionel Barrymore, who initially scolded Gable for what he deemed amateurish acting but nevertheless urged him to pursue a stage career. During the 1927–28 theater season, he acted with the Laskin Brothers Stock Company in Houston, Texas; while there, he played many roles, gained considerable experience, and became a local matinee idol. He then moved to New York City, where Dillon sought work for him on Broadway. He received good reviews in Machinal (1928), with one critic describing him as "young, vigorous, and brutally masculine".

Gable and Dillon separated, filing for divorce in March 1929, while he began working on the play Hawk Island in New York which ran for 24 performances. In April 1930, Gable's divorce became final, and a few days later he married Texas socialite Maria Franklin Prentiss Lucas Langham, nicknamed "Ria". After moving to California, they were married again in 1931, possibly due to differences in state legal requirements.

1930–1935: Early success

In 1930, after his impressive appearance as the seething and desperate character Killer Mears in the Los Angeles stage production of The Last Mile, Gable was offered a contract with Pathe Pictures. His only film for them and first role in a sound picture was as the unshaven villain in their low-budget William Boyd Western, The Painted Desert (1931). The studio experienced financial problems after the film's delayed release, so Gable left for work at Warner Bros.

The same year in Night Nurse, Gable played a villainous chauffeur who knocked Barbara Stanwyck's character unconscious for trying to save two children whom he was methodically starving to death. The supporting role was originally slated for James Cagney until the release of The Public Enemy catapulted him to star status. "His ears are too big and he looks like an ape", said Warner Bros. executive Darryl F. Zanuck about Gable, after testing him for the second male lead in the studio's gangster drama Little Caesar (1931). After his failed screen test for Zanuck, Gable was signed in 1930 by MGM's Irving Thalberg for $650 per week. He hired the well-connected Minna Wallis, a sister of producer Hal Wallis, as his agent, whose clients included actresses Claudette Colbert, Myrna Loy and Norma Shearer.

Gable's arrival in Hollywood occurred when MGM was looking to expand its stable of male stars, and he fit the bill. He made two pictures in 1931 with Wallace Beery. In the first, he had a seventh-billed support role in The Secret Six, although his role was much larger than the billing would indicate, then he achieved second billing in a part almost as large as the film's star Beery in the naval aviation film Hell Divers. MGM's publicity manager Howard Strickling started developing Gable's studio image with Screenland magazine playing up his "lumberjack-in-evening-clothes" persona.

To increasing popularity, MGM frequently paired him with well-established female stars. Joan Crawford asked for him to appear with her in Dance, Fools, Dance (1931). The electricity of the pair was recognized by studio executive Louis B. Mayer, who would not only put them in seven more films but also began reshooting Complete Surrender, replacing John Mack Brown as Crawford's leading man and retitling the film Laughing Sinners (1931). His fame and public visibility after A Free Soul (1931), in which he played a gangster who shoved the character played by Norma Shearer, ensured that Gable never played a supporting role again. He received extensive fan mail as a result of his performance; the studio took notice. The Hollywood Reporter wrote "A star in the making has been made, one that, to our reckoning, will outdraw every other star ... Never have we seen audiences work themselves into such enthusiasm as when Clark Gable walks on the screen."

Gable co-starred in Susan Lenox (Her Fall and Rise) (1931) with Greta Garbo, and in Possessed (1931), a film about an illicit romantic affair, with Joan Crawford (who was then married to Douglas Fairbanks, Jr.). Adela Rogers St. Johns later dubbed Gable and Crawford's real-life relationship as "the affair that nearly burned Hollywood down". Louis B. Mayer threatened to terminate both their contracts, and for a while, they kept apart when Gable shifted his attentions to Marion Davies as he costarred with her in Polly of the Circus (1932). Gable was considered for the role of Tarzan in Tarzan the Ape Man, but lost out to Johnny Weissmuller's more imposing physique and superior swimming prowess. Gable then starred as the romantic lead in Strange Interlude (1932), again teaming with Shearer, the second of three films they would make together for MGM.

Next, Gable starred with Jean Harlow in the romantic comedy-drama Red Dust (1932) set on a rubber plantation in Indochina. Gable portrayed a plantation manager involved with Harlow's wisecracking prostitute; however, upon her arrival, Gable's character started to pursue Mary Astor's prim, classy newlywed. While some critics thought Harlow stole the show, many agreed that Gable was a natural screen partner.

Gable's "unshaven love-making" with braless Jean Harlow in Red Dust made him MGM's most important romantic leading man. With Gable established as a star, MGM positioned him in the same manner as Harlow for Myrna Loy, a previously lesser billed actor in Night Flight, moving Loy to a costar role in Men in White, a movie filmed in 1933, though delayed in release due to pre-Code Legion of Decency cuts until 1934. The relationship of a doctor (Gable) and nurse (Elizabeth Allan) implied intimacy with a resulting complication of pregnancy, a sensitive issue and new image for Gable.

Gable and Harlow were then teamed in Hold Your Man (1933), China Seas (1935), in which the pair were billed above Wallace Beery, and Wife vs. Secretary (1936) with Myrna Loy costarring and supported by newcomer James Stewart. A popular combination on-screen and off, Gable and Harlow made six films together in five years. Their final film together was Saratoga (1937), a bigger hit than their previous collaborations. Harlow died during its production. The film was ninety percent completed, and the remaining scenes were filmed with long shots or the use of doubles like Mary Dees; Gable said he felt as if he were "in the arms of a ghost".

In 1934, MGM did not have a project ready for Gable that he was interested in, paying him $2,000 a week under his contract to do nothing. Studio head Louis B. Mayer lent him to Columbia for $2,500 per week, making a $500 per week profit. Gable was not Capra's first choice to play the lead role of newspaper reporter Peter Warne in the romantic comedy It Happened One Night (1934) opposite Claudette Colbert playing a spoiled heiress, but Columbia wanted him and had paid handsomely for it. Robert Montgomery was originally offered the role but said he declined, feeling the script was poor.

Filming for the movie, in which Gable and Colbert's characters have to travel together from Florida to New York by whatever means available, began in a tense atmosphere; nevertheless, both Gable and director Frank Capra enjoyed making the movie. It Happened One Night became the first movie to sweep all five of the major Academy Awards, with Gable winning for Best Actor and Colbert for Best Actress. "Critics praised the fast-paced farce that would enter in a whole new romantic genre: the screwball comedy." The movie opened slowly at the box office, but once word of mouth spread it became a big hit, with men's underwear sales plummeting because Gable didn't wear an undershirt in the movie. 
Gable's career was revitalized by his whimsical, good-natured performance and to Capra, Gable's character in the film closely resembled his real personality:

It Happened One Night is the real Gable. He was never able to play that kind of character except in that one film. They had him playing these big, huff-and-puff he-man lovers, but he was not that kind of guy. He was a down-to-earth guy, he loved everything, he got down with the common people. He didn't want to play those big lover parts; he just wanted to play Clark Gable, the way he was in It Happened One Night, and it's too bad they didn't let him keep up with that.

It Happened One Night clinched stardom for Gable making him a bigger star than ever. From 1934 until 1942, when World War II interrupted his movie career, he was near the top of the box office money-makers lists.

Gable's first movie role back at MGM was to portray reluctant leader of mutineers Fletcher Christian, an "Englishman in knickers and a three-cornered hat", one he had to be talked into by friend and producer Irving Thalberg, and of which Gable said "I stink in it" after filming. Mutiny on the Bounty (1935) was a critical and commercial success, receiving eight Academy Award nominations. There were three Best Actor nominations for stars Gable, Charles Laughton and Franchot Tone, and the film won Best Picture, the second of three films in which Gable played a leading role to do so. The film cost $2 million and grossed $4.5 million, making it one of the top moneymakers that decade. It used life-size replicas of the Bounty and Pandora, and was partly filmed in Catalina and French Polynesia.

1936–1938: Spencer Tracy collaborations 

Gable made three pictures with Spencer Tracy, which boosted Tracy's career and permanently cemented them in the public mind as a team. San Francisco (1936), with Jeannette MacDonald, featured Tracy for only 17 minutes in an Oscar-nominated portrayal of a Catholic priest who knocks Gable down in a boxing ring. The film was a box office hit and remains the third-highest-grossing film of Gable's career. Their next film together was the Academy Award–nominated box office success Test Pilot (1938), with Myrna Loy, who made seven pictures with Gable. He plays Jim Lane, the test pilot of the title; Tracy is his sidekick mechanic, Gunner Morse.

For their final film, 1940's Boom Town, Tracy would play a larger role, with billing directly under Gable and above Claudette Colbert and Hedy Lamarr. The picture, a lavish epic about two oil wildcatters who become partners then rivals, was a box office success, earning $5 million. Gable and Tracy were off-screen friends; Tracy was one of the few Hollywood industry luminaries who attended Lombard's private funeral. After Boom Town no more Gable-Tracy partnerships were possible; Tracy's success led to a new contract and both stars had conflicting stipulations requiring top billing in MGM movie credits and on promotional posters.

1939: Gone with the Wind

Despite his reluctance to play the role, Gable is best known for his Oscar-nominated performance in the Academy Award-winning best picture Gone with the Wind (1939). Carole Lombard may have been the first to suggest that he play Rhett Butler (and she play Scarlett) when she bought him a copy of the best-seller, which he refused to read.

Butler's last line in Gone with the Wind, "Frankly, my dear, I don't give a damn", is one of the most famous lines in movie history. Gable was an almost immediate favorite for the role of Rhett with both the public and producer David O. Selznick. Since Selznick had no male stars under long-term contract, he needed to negotiate with another studio to borrow an actor. Gary Cooper was Selznick's first choice. When Cooper turned down the role of Butler, he was quoted as saying, "Gone With the Wind is going to be the biggest flop in Hollywood history. I'm glad it'll be Clark Gable who's falling flat on his nose, not me." By then, Selznick had become determined to hire Gable, and set about finding a way to borrow him from MGM. Gable was wary of potentially disappointing an audience that had decided that no one else could play the part. He later conceded, "I think I know now how a fly must react after being caught in a spider's web."

According to Lennie Bluett, an extra in the film, Gable almost walked off the set when he discovered the studio facilities were segregated and signage posted "White" and "Colored". Gable phoned the film's director Victor Fleming and told him, "If you don't get those signs down, you won't get your Rhett Butler." The signs were then taken down. Gable tried to boycott the Gone with the Wind premiere in segregated Atlanta, because African American McDaniel and Butterfly McQueen were not permitted to attend. He reportedly only went after McDaniel pleaded with him to go. They appeared in several more films, remaining life-long friends and he always attended her Hollywood parties.

Gable did not want to shed tears for the scene after Rhett inadvertently causes Scarlett to miscarry their second child. Olivia de Havilland made him cry, later commenting, "Oh, he would not do it. He would not! Victor (Fleming) tried everything with him. He tried to attack him on a professional level. We had done it without him weeping several times and then we had one last try. I said, 'You can do it, I know you can do it, and you will be wonderful...' Well, by heaven, just before the cameras rolled, you could see the tears come up at his eyes and he played the scene unforgettably well. He put his whole heart into it." The role was one of Gable's most layered performances and partially based on the personality of director and friend Fleming.

Years later, Gable said that whenever his career would start to fade, a re-release of Gone with the Wind would soon revive his popularity, and he continued as a top leading actor for the rest of his life. One reissue publicized "Clark Gable never tires of holding Vivien Leigh".

Marriage to Carole Lombard 

Gable's relationship and marriage in 1939 to his third wife, actress Carole Lombard (1908–1942), was one of the happiest periods of his personal life. They met while filming 1932's No Man of Her Own, when Lombard was still married to actor William Powell. A Gable and Lombard romance did not take off until 1936, after becoming reacquainted at a party. They were soon inseparable, with fan magazines and tabloids citing them as an official couple.

Gable thrived being around Lombard's youthful, charming, and frank personality, once stating: 

Gable was still legally married, having prolonged an expensive divorce from his second wife, Ria Langham, until his salary from Gone with the Wind enabled him to reach a divorce settlement with her on March 7, 1939. On March 29, during a production break on Gone with the Wind, Gable and Lombard were married in Kingman, Arizona and honeymooned in room 1201 of the Arizona Biltmore Hotel. They purchased a ranch previously owned by director Raoul Walsh in Encino, California, for $50,000 making it their home. The couple, who lovingly referred to each other as "Ma and Pa", owned a menagerie of animals and raised chickens and horses there.

With the bombing of Pearl Harbor many Hollywood stars joined the war effort, some such as James Stewart signing up for active duty. Carole Lombard sent a telegram to President Roosevelt on behalf of Gable expressing his interest in doing so, but F.D.R. thought the 41-year-old actor could best serve by increased patriotic roles in movies and bond drives, which Lombard tirelessly began.

On January 16, 1942, Lombard was a passenger on Transcontinental and Western Air Flight 3 with her mother and press agent Otto Winkler. She had just finished her 57th movie, To Be or Not to Be, and was on her way home from a successful war bond selling tour when the flight's DC-3 airliner crashed into Potosi Mountain near Las Vegas, Nevada, killing all 22 passengers aboard, including 15 servicemen en route to training in California. Gable flew to the crash site to claim the bodies of his wife, mother-in-law, and Winkler, who had been the best man at Gable and Lombard's wedding. Lombard was declared to be the first war-related American female casualty of World War II, and Gable received a personal note of condolence from President Roosevelt. The Civil Aeronautics Board investigation into the crash concluded that pilot error was its cause.

Gable returned to their Encino ranch and carried out her funeral wishes as she had requested in her will. A month later, he returned to the studio to work with Lana Turner in their second movie together, Somewhere I'll Find You. Having lost 20 pounds since the tragedy, Gable evidently was emotionally and physically devastated, but Turner stated that Gable remained a "consummate professional" for the duration of filming. He acted in 27 more films, and remarried twice more. "But he was never the same", according to Esther Williams. "He had been devastated by Carole's death."

1939–1942: Continuing career 
Between his marriage to Lombard and her death, Gable again costarred with Norma Shearer in the World War II romantic intrigue film, Idiot's Delight (1939). He plays a nightclub singer that doesn't recognize former love (Shearer) while Nazis are closing in on guests at a hotel on the brink of war. The film is memorable for Gable's song and dance routine, "Puttin' on the Ritz" and an alternative ending.

Gable also starred in Strange Cargo (1940), a romantic drama with Joan Crawford, costarring Peter Lorre and Ian Hunter. The film's focus is on Gable and French Devil's Islands convicts in an escape from the penal colony, who on the way pick up a local entertainer (Crawford) whom Gable had met earlier in the movie. In their eighth and last film together, Gable and Crawford "again demonstrated their on-screen magic" and the film was among the top ten grossing films for the year.

Gable then made his first film with 20-year old Lana Turner, a newcomer whom MGM saw as a successor for both Crawford and the now-deceased Jean Harlow. Honky Tonk (1941) is a western where Gable's con-man/gambler character romances Turner, a prim, young judge's daughter. Gable had been reluctant to act opposite the younger Turner in the required romantic scenes. But their chemistry served them well in this and three later films, with Honky Tonk finishing third at the box office that year.

Since the couple had been popular with the public, Gable and Turner were quickly paired again in Somewhere I'll Find You (1941) as war correspondents who travel to the Pacific theatre and get caught up in a Japanese attack. The movie was another hit finishing No. 8 at the box office for 1942. Film historian David Thomson wrote the quality of his movies after Gone With the Wind "hardly befitted a national idol" and began a career decline for Gable.

1942–1944: World War II 

On August 12, 1942, following Lombard's death and completion of the film Somewhere I'll Find You, Gable joined the United States Army, under the Army Air Forces. Lombard had suggested that Gable enlist as part of the war effort, but MGM was reluctant to let him go. Commanding General of the U.S. Army Air Forces Henry H. "Hap" Arnold offered Gable a "special assignment" with the First Motion Picture Unit following basic training.

The Washington newspaper The Evening Star reported that Gable took a physical examination at Bolling Field on June 19, preliminary to joining the service.

"Mr. Gable, it was learned from a source outside the war department, conferred with Lieutenant General H. H. Arnold, head of the air forces yesterday." The Star continued, "It was understood that Mr. Gable, if he is commissioned, will make movies for the air forces. Lieutenant Jimmy Stewart, another actor in uniform, has been doing this."

Gable had expressed an earlier interest in officer candidate school, with the intention of becoming an aerial gunner upon enlisting in bomber training school. MGM arranged for his studio friend, the cinematographer Andrew McIntyre, to enlist with him and accompany him through training.

On August 17, 1942, shortly after his enlistment, he and McIntyre were sent to Miami Beach, Florida, where they entered USAAF OCS Class 42-E. Both completed training on October 28, 1942, and were commissioned as second lieutenants. His class of about 2,600 students (of which he ranked about 700th) selected Gable as its graduation speaker. General Arnold presented the cadets with their commissions. Arnold then informed Gable of his special assignment: to make a recruiting film in combat with the Eighth Air Force to recruit aerial gunners. Gable and McIntyre were immediately sent to Flexible Gunnery School at Tyndall Field, Florida, followed by a photography course at Fort George Wright, Washington State and promoted to first lieutenants upon its completion.

On January 27, 1943, Gable reported to Biggs Army Airfield, Texas to train with and accompany the 351st Bomb Group to England as head of a six-man motion picture unit. In addition to McIntyre, he recruited the screenwriter John Lee Mahin, camera operators Sgts. Mario Toti and Robert Boles, and the sound man Lt. Howard Voss, to complete his crew. Gable was promoted to captain while he was with the 351st Bomb Group at Pueblo Army Air Base, Colorado, a rank commensurate with his position as a unit commander. (Prior to this, he and McIntyre were both first lieutenants.)

Gable spent most of 1943 in England at RAF Polebrook with the 351st Bomb Group. Gable flew five combat missions, including one to Germany, as an observer-gunner in B-17 Flying Fortresses between May 4 and September 23, 1943, earning the Air Medal and the Distinguished Flying Cross for his efforts. During one of the missions, Gable's aircraft was damaged by flak and attacked by fighters, which knocked out one of the engines and shot up the stabilizer. In the raid on Germany, one crewman was killed and two others were wounded, and flak went through Gable's boot and narrowly missed his head. When word of this reached MGM, studio executives began to badger the Army Air Forces to reassign its most valuable screen actor to noncombat duty. In November 1943, Gable returned to the United States to edit his film, on an old Warner's lot donated to the war effort, assigned to the 18th AAF Base Unit (Motion Picture Unit) at Culver City, California, where other stars contributed with any film equipment they had as well.

In June 1944, Gable was promoted to major. While he hoped for another combat assignment, he had been placed on inactive duty and on June 12, 1944, his discharge papers were signed by Captain (later U.S. president) Ronald Reagan. Gable completed editing of the film Combat America in September 1944, giving the narration himself and making use of numerous interviews with enlisted gunners as focus of the film. Because his motion picture production schedule made it impossible for him to fulfill reserve officer duties, he resigned his commission on September 26, 1947, a week after the Air Force became an independent service branch.

Adolf Hitler favored Gable above all other actors. During World War II, Hitler offered a sizable reward to anyone who could capture and bring Gable to him unscathed.

Gable was awarded military honors for service: the Distinguished Flying Cross, Air Medal, American Campaign Medal, European-African-Middle Eastern Campaign Medal, and World War II Victory Medal. He was a qualified aerial gunner having received his wings upon completion of flexible gunnery school at Tyndall field.

He made good use of his wartime experiences in the movie Command Decision (1948), playing a World War II brigadier general who supervised bombing raids over Germany. Variety said, "His is a believable delivery, interpreting the brigadier-general who must send his men out to almost certain death with an understanding that bespeaks his sympathy with the soldier... ".

1945–1953: After World War II 
Immediately after his discharge from the service, Gable returned to his ranch and rested. Personally, he resumed a pre-war relationship with Virginia Grey, a co-star from Test Pilot and Idiot's Delight, that newspapers reported might be the next Mrs. Gable. Professionally, Gable's first movie after World War II was Adventure (1945), with Greer Garson, by then the leading female star at MGM. Given the famous teaser tagline "Gable's back, and Garson's got him", the film was a commercial hit, earning over $6 million, but a critical failure.

Gable was acclaimed for his performance in The Hucksters (1947), a satire of post-war Madison Avenue corruption and immorality, which co-starred Deborah Kerr and Ava Gardner. The film was popular with audiences, placing 11th at the box office, but both Variety and The New York Times reviewed it as a sanitized version of the novel with script issues, that was heavy on Gable screentime, who struggled in the role.

Gable followed this up with Homecoming (1948), where he played a married doctor enlisting in World War II and meeting Lana Turner's army surgical nurse character with a romance unfolding in flashbacks. After that he made the war film Command Decision (1948), a psychological drama with Walter Pidgeon, Van Johnson, Brian Donlevy, and John Hodiak. It was a hit with audiences, but it lost MGM money due to the high cost of the all-star cast.

A very public and brief romance with Paulette Goddard occurred after that. In 1949, Gable married Sylvia Ashley, a British model and actress previously married to Douglas Fairbanks, Sr. The relationship was profoundly unsuccessful; they divorced in 1952.

Gable did a series of films with female co-stars: Any Number Can Play (1950) with Alexis Smith, Key to the City (1950) with Loretta Young, and To Please a Lady (1950) with Barbara Stanwyck. They were reasonably popular, but he had more success with two Westerns: Across the Wide Missouri (1951), and Lone Star (1952).

He then made Never Let Me Go (1953) opposite Gene Tierney. Tierney was a favorite of Gable's, and he was very disappointed when her mental health problems caused her to be replaced in Mogambo by Grace Kelly.

Mogambo (1953), directed by John Ford, was a somewhat sanitized and more action-oriented remake of Gable's hit pre-Code film Red Dust, with Jean Harlow and Mary Astor. Ava Gardner, in her third and final pairing with Gable, was well received in Harlow's leading lady role, as was Kelly in Astor's role, with both receiving Academy Award nominations, Gardner for Lead Actress and Kelly for Supporting Actress. While on location in Africa, reports of an affair between Gable and Kelly began to surface (the result of private dinners the stars were having), but their relationship was an intense friendship according to costar Gardner, with Kelly herself later commenting on the lack of any sexual aspect, "maybe because of the age difference". The publicity only helped ticket sales as the film finished No. 7 at the box office, grossing 8.2 million for the year, easily his most popular hit since he returned to MGM after the war.

1954: Leaving MGM

Despite the positive critical and public response to Mogambo, Gable became increasingly unhappy with what he considered mediocre roles offered by MGM, while the studio regarded his salary as excessive. Studio head Louis B. Mayer was fired in 1951, amid slumping revenue and increased Hollywood production costs, due in large part to the rising popularity of television. The new studio head, former production chief Dore Schary, struggled to maintain profits for the studio. Many long-time MGM stars were fired, or their contracts were not renewed, including Greer Garson and Judy Garland.

Gable refused to renew his contract. His last film at MGM was Betrayed (1954), an espionage wartime drama with Turner and Victor Mature. Critic Paul Mavis wrote, "Gable and Turner just don't click the way they should here...poor plots and lines never stopped these two pros from turning in good performances in other films." In March 1954, Gable left MGM.

1955–1957: After MGM 
His next two films were made for 20th Century Fox: Soldier of Fortune, an adventure story in Hong Kong with Susan Hayward, and The Tall Men (1955), a Western with Jane Russell and Robert Ryan. Both were profitable, although only modest successes, earning Gable his first profit sharing royalties. In 1955, Gable would be 10th at the box office – the last time he was in the top ten.

That same year, Gable married fifth wife Kay Spreckels (née Kathleen Williams). A former fashion model and actress, she had previously been married three times: first to Charles Capps (1937–39), then to Argentinian cattle tycoon Martín de Alzaga (1942–43), and to sugar-refining heir Adolph B. Spreckels, Jr. (1945–52). Gable became stepfather to her son Bunker Spreckels, who went on to live a notorious celebrity lifestyle in the late 1960s and early 1970s surfing scene, ultimately leading to his early death in 1977.

Gable also formed Russ-Field-Gabco in 1955, a production company with Jane Russell and her husband Bob Waterfield, and they produced The King and Four Queens (1956), a film Gable thought would also star Russell to capitalize on The Tall Men's moderate success. That role instead went to Jo Van Fleet. It was Gable's only time as producer. He found producing and acting to be too much work and this Raoul Walsh western was the only film made.

After turning down the lead role in Universal-International's Away All Boats, his next project was the Warner Bros. production Band of Angels (1957), co-starring Yvonne De Carlo and featuring relative newcomer Sidney Poitier; it was not well received, despite Gable's role's similarities to Rhett Butler. Newsweek said, "Here is a movie so bad that it must be seen to be disbelieved."

1958–1960: Paramount 
Next, he paired with Doris Day in Teacher's Pet (1958), shot in black and white at Paramount. He did Run Silent, Run Deep (also 1958), with co-star and producer Burt Lancaster, which featured his first on-screen death since 1937, and which garnered good reviews. Gable started to receive television offers, but rejected them outright. At 57, Gable finally acknowledged, "Now it's time I acted my age". His contracts began including a clause that his filming and work days ended at 5 p.m.

His next two films were light comedies for Paramount: But Not for Me (1959) with Carroll Baker, and It Started in Naples (1960) with Sophia Loren. Naples, was written and directed by Melville Shavelson and it mainly showed the beauty of Loren and the Italian island Capri. It was a box-office success and was nominated for an Academy Award for art direction and two Golden Globes, one for picture and Loren for actress in a leading role. Filmed mostly on location in Italy, it was Gable's last film released in color. While there Gable's weight had increased to 230 pounds, something he credited to pasta, and he started on a crash diet to achieve a goal weight of 195, along with briefly quitting drinking and smoking, to pass a required physical for his next movie.

On February 8, 1960, Gable received a star on the Hollywood Walk of Fame for his work in motion pictures, located at 1608 Vine Street.

1961: The Misfits

Gable's last film was The Misfits (1961), with a script by Arthur Miller and directed by John Huston. Co-starring with Gable were Marilyn Monroe (in her last completed film), Montgomery Clift, Eli Wallach and Thelma Ritter. Many critics regard Gable's performance to be his finest, and Gable, after seeing the rough cuts, agreed, although the film did not receive any Oscar nominations. Miller wrote the screenplay for his wife Monroe; it was about two aging cowboys and a pilot that go mustanging in Reno, Nevada, who all fall for a blonde. In 1961, it was a somewhat disconnected film with its antihero western themes, but it has since become a classic.

Portraitist Al Hirschfeld created a drawing, and then a lithograph, portraying the film's stars Clift, Monroe, and Gable with screenwriter Miller, in what is suggested as a typical "on-the-set" scene during the troubled production. In a 2002 documentary Eli Wallach recalled the mustang wrangling scenes Gable insisted on performing himself, "You have to pass a physical to film that" and "He was a professional going home at 5 p.m. to a pregnant wife". The New York Times found "Mr. Gable's performance as a leathery old cowboy with a realistic slant on most plain things" ironically vital, with his death before the film's release.

Politics 
Gable was a conservative Republican.

In 1944, Gable became an early member of the conservative Motion Picture Alliance for the Preservation of American Ideals, a group explicitly created to help root our Communists from the film industry. In addition to Gable, its members included such industry heavyweights as Walt  Disney, Ayn Rand, Ronald Reagan, and John Wayne; they helped create and enforce the Hollywood blacklist, often by testifying under oath before the House Un-American Activities Committee.

Illness and death 

 
On November 6, 1960, Gable was sent to Hollywood Presbyterian Medical Center in Los Angeles, where doctors found that he had suffered a heart attack. Newspaper reports the following day listed his condition as satisfactory. By the morning of November 16, he seemed to be improving, but he died that evening at the age of 59 from a second heart attack caused by an infection. Medical staff did not perform cardiopulmonary resuscitation for fear that the procedure would rupture Gable's heart, and a defibrillator was not available.

Gable is interred in the Great Mausoleum, Memorial Terrace, at Glendale's Forest Lawn Memorial Park next to Carole Lombard and her mother. An honor guard and pallbearers Spencer Tracy and James Stewart were in attendance. Twenty-two years later Kay Gable died and was interred there as well.

Personal life 
In 1933, Gable was initiated into Freemasonry at the Beverly Hills Lodge No. 528 CA.

Marriages and children 

Gable married 5 times and was linked romantically to many other women. 

His first engagement was to actress Franz Dorfler when he was about 21. Dorfler introduced Gable to Josephine Dillon, who would become his acting coach, manager, and then his wife. When Gable and Dillon married in 1924, Gable was 23 and Dillion was 40; the couple divorced in 1930. 

His second wife was Texas socialite Maria Franklin Prentiss Lucas Langham (nicknamed "Ria"). The couple divorced on March 7, 1939. 

Thirteen days after his divorce from Langham, Gable married actress Carole Lombard during a production break on Gone with the Wind.  Lombard died in a plane crash less than three years later.

In 1949, Gable married Sylvia Ashley, a British model and actress who was the widow of Douglas Fairbanks; the couple divorced in 1952.

In 1955, Gable married Kay Spreckels (née Kathleen Williams), a thrice-married former fashion model and actress who had previously been married to sugar-refining heir Adolph B. Spreckels, Jr.

Four months after his 1961 death, Kay Gable gave birth to his only biological son, John Clark Gable. John Clark raced cars and trucks most notably in the Baja 500 and 1000, turning down Hollywood offers to act until Bad Jim (1990), a straight to video film. By 1999, his work with The Clark Gable Foundation helped restore the house in which his father was born and open it as a museum in Cadiz, Ohio. He had two children: Kayley Gable (born 1986) and Clark James Gable (1988–2019). Kayley is an actress, while Clark James was the host of two seasons of the nationally syndicated reality show Cheaters. Clark James died at age 30 on February 22, 2019.

During the filming of The Call of the Wild in early 1935, the film's lead actress, Loretta Young, became pregnant with Gable's child. Their daughter Judy Lewis was born on November 6, 1935, in Venice, California. Young hid her pregnancy in an elaborate scheme. Nineteen months after the birth, she claimed to have adopted the baby. Most in Hollywood (and some in the general public) believed Gable was Lewis's father because of their strong resemblance and the timing of her birth.

Allegations of rape 

In 1935, Clark Gable allegedly date-raped co-star Loretta Young while on an overnight train from a studio location to Hollywood. Five years after Gable's death, when confronted by Lewis, Loretta Young said that she was Lewis's biological mother and that Gable was her father by an affair. Young died on August 12, 2000; her autobiography, published posthumously, confirmed that Gable was indeed Lewis's father. Judy Lewis died of cancer at age 76 on November 25, 2011. In 2015, Young's daughter-in-law alleged that Young had said in 1998 that Judy Lewis was conceived by date rape. Young had previously admitted to an affair with Gable, which was a known secret in Hollywood at the time. Young's family had chosen to remain silent about the information until both Young and Lewis were deceased; they went public with the information four years after Lewis's death.

Style and reception 
In a photo essay of Hollywood film stars, Life magazine called Gable, "All man ... and then some."

Doris Day summed up Gable's unique personality: "He was as masculine as any man I've ever known, and as much a little boy as a grown man could be —it was this combination that had such a devastating effect on women."

An eight-time co-star, long-time friend and on-again, off-again romance, Joan Crawford concurred, stating on David Frost's TV show in January 1970 that, "He was a king wherever he went. He earned the title. He walked like one, he behaved like one, and he was the most masculine man that I have ever met in my life. Gable had balls."

Robert Taylor said Gable "was a great, great guy, and certainly one of the great stars of all times, if not the greatest. I think that I sincerely doubt that there will ever be another like Clark Gable; he was one of a kind."

In his memoir Bring on the Empty Horses, David Niven states that Gable, a close friend, was extremely supportive after the sudden, accidental death of Niven's first wife, Primula (Primmie), in 1946. Primmie had supported Gable emotionally after Carole Lombard's death four years earlier: Niven recounts Gable kneeling at Primmie's feet and sobbing while she held and consoled him. Niven also states that Arthur Miller, the author of The Misfits, had described Gable as "the man who did not know how to hate."

Gable has been criticized for altering aspects of a script he felt were in conflict with his image. Screenwriter Larry Gelbart, as quoted in James Garner's biography stated that Gable, "... refused to go down with the submarine, because Gable doesn't sink." (In reference to Gable's film Run Silent, Run Deep). The novel's author, Capt. Beach, noted changes should be made among the crew to get a Hollywood audience and where a subsequent battle sequence was altered when he should have had script approval, feeling his book was bought by United Artists for its title.

Eli Wallach recalls in his 2006 autobiography The Good, The Bad and Me, that what he felt was one of his best dramatic scenes in The Misfits was cut from the script. Wallach's character is emotionally crushed when he visits Roslyn (Marilyn Monroe), and instead runs into Gable's character and realizes any hope with Roslyn is dashed. Gable asked (within his contractual rights) that the scene be removed, and when Wallach spoke to him, Gable explained he felt that "his character would never steal a woman from a friend."

In popular culture 

Warner Bros. cartoons sometimes caricatured Gable. Examples include: Have You Got Any Castles? (in which his face appears seven times inside the novel "The House of the Seven Gables"), The Coo-Coo Nut Grove (in which his ears flap on their own), Hollywood Steps Out (in which he follows an enigmatic woman), and Cats Don't Dance (in which he appears on a billboard promotion for Gone with the Wind and on the backlot of MGM).

Along with actor Kent Taylor, Clark Gable served as the inspiration behind the name of Superman's alter-ego Clark Kent.

In the film Broadway Melody of 1938, Judy Garland (aged 15) sings "You Made Me Love You" while looking at a composite picture of Gable. The opening lines are: "Dear Mr Gable, I am writing this to you, and I hope that you will read it so you'll know, my heart beats like a hammer, and I stutter and I stammer, every time I see you at the picture show, I guess I'm just another fan of yours, and I thought I'd write and tell you so. You made me love you, I didn't want to do it, I didn't want to do it..."

Bugs Bunny's nonchalant carrot-chewing standing position, as explained by Chuck Jones, Friz Freleng, and Bob Clampett, originated in a scene in the film It Happened One Night, in which Clark Gable's character leans against a fence, eating carrots rapidly and talking with his mouth full to Claudette Colbert's character. This scene was well known while the film was popular, and viewers at the time likely recognized Bugs Bunny's behavior as parody.

The 1948 show tune “Always True to You in My Fashion” contains the lyrics “Mister Gable, I mean Clark / Wants me on his boat to park".

The 1975 film Monty Python and the Holy Grail contained a reference to impersonating Gable in the song performed by the Knights of the Round Table.

The 2003 music album Give Up by The Postal Service has a song titled "Clark Gable". The singer wants to "find a love that looks and sounds like a movie", and includes the lyric, "I kissed you in a style Clark Gable would have admired, I thought it classic".

Gable has been portrayed in a number of films. Actors who have played the role include: Phillip Waldron in It Happened in Hollywood (1937), James Brolin in Gable and Lombard (1976), Larry Pennell in Marilyn: The Untold Story (1980), Edward Winter in Moviola: The Scarlett O'Hara War (1980), Boyd Holister in Grace Kelly (1983), Gary Wayne in Malice in Wonderland (1985), Gene Daily in The Rocketeer (1991), Bobby Valentino in RKO 281 (1999), Bruce Hughes and Shayne Greenman in Blonde (2001), and Charles Unwin in Lucy (2003).

Filmography 

Gable is known to have appeared as an "extra" in 13 films between 1924 and 1930. He then appeared in a total of 67 theatrically released motion pictures, as himself in 17 "short subject" films, and he narrated and appeared in a 1945 World War II propaganda film entitled Combat America, produced by the United States Army Air Forces.

See also 
 List of actors with Academy Award nominations
 List of members of the American Legion

References

Works cited

Bibliography

External links 

 
 
 
 
 Clark Gable at Virtual History
 Clark Gable at National Museum of the United States Air Force – AF.mil
 Combat America at the Internet Archive: Part 1, Part 2, Part 3, Part 4

1901 births
1960 deaths
20th-century American male actors
20th-century American memoirists
American Freemasons
American male film actors
American male silent film actors
American male stage actors
American people of Pennsylvania Dutch descent
Best Actor Academy Award winners
Burials at Forest Lawn Memorial Park (Glendale)
California Republicans
First Motion Picture Unit personnel
Male actors from Ohio
Metro-Goldwyn-Mayer contract players
Military personnel from California
Military personnel from Ohio
People from Brentwood, Los Angeles
People from Cadiz, Ohio
People from Encino, Los Angeles
People from Portage County, Ohio
Recipients of the Air Medal
Recipients of the Distinguished Flying Cross (United States)
United States Army Air Forces officers
United States Army Air Forces personnel of World War II
Conservatism in the United States
American people of Belgian descent
United Service Organizations entertainers